Harold Palmer may refer to:

 Harold E. Palmer (1877–1949), English linguist and phonetician
 Harold Sutton Palmer (1854–1933), English watercolour landscape painter and illustrator
 Harold Palmer (cricketer) (1890–1967), English cricketer